The Queen of Spain is a 2016 Spanish comedy-drama film written and directed by Fernando Trueba. Starring Penélope Cruz, Antonio Resines, Neus Asensi, Ana Belén, Javier Cámara, Chino Darín, Loles León, Arturo Ripstein, Jorge Sanz, Rosa Maria Sardà, Santiago Segura, Clive Revill, Cary Elwes and Mandy Patinkin. It was shown in the Berlinale Special section of the 67th Berlin International Film Festival.

The movie is a sequel to Trueba's 1998 drama The Girl of Your Dreams with Cruz, Resines, Asensi, León, Sanz, Sardà and Segura reprising their roles from the previous film.

It was nominated for 5 Goya Awards at the 31st Goya Awards, without winning any, including the nomination for Cruz as Best Actress for the same role for which she had won the Best Actress Award at the 13th Goya Awards, making her the first actress to be nominated twice for the same role in two different films.

Plot
Nearly twenty years after the events of The Girl of Your Dreams, in the 1950s, Macarena Granada, who has become a Hollywood star, returns to Spain to film a blockbuster about Queen Isabella I of Castile.

Cast

Production 
The film was produced by Fernando Trueba PC and Atresmedia Cine and it had the participation of Movistar+. Marta Velasco was responsible for film editing.

Accolades 

|-
| align = "center" rowspan = "5" | 2017 || rowspan=5 | 31st Goya Awards || Best Actress || Penélope Cruz ||  || rowspan = "5" | 
|-
| Best Cinematography
| José Luis Alcaine
| 
|-
| Best Art Direction
| Juan Pedro de Gaspar
| 
|-
| Best Production Supervision
| Pilar Robla
| 
|-
| Best Costume Design
| Lala Huete
| 
|}

References

External links
 
 

2016 comedy-drama films
2010s Spanish-language films
2010s English-language films
Spanish comedy-drama films
2016 films
Films directed by Fernando Trueba
Films scored by Zbigniew Preisner
Films set in the 1950s
Atresmedia Cine films
2010s Spanish films